Home improvement is the process of renovating a home.

Home Improvement may also refer to:
 Home Improvement (TV series), a 1990s U.S. television sitcom starring Tim Allen
Home Improvement: Power Tool Pursuit!, video game based on the TV series
"Home Improvement", an episode of Beavis and Butt-head
 Home Improvements, a 2007 album by My Friend the Chocolate Cake